BSAM may refer to:

 Basic sequential access method, a data set access method
 Birendra Sainik Awasiya Mahavidyalaya, the only Nepalese military boarding high school